Henryk Wojciech Kasperczak (born 10 July 1946) is a Polish football manager and a former player who most recently managed the Tunisia national football team.

As a player, Kasperczak took part in two FIFA World Cups with Poland, achieving third place in 1974, as well as a silver medal at the 1976 Summer Olympics in Montreal, Quebec, Canada.

As a manager, Kasperczak enjoyed most success in the African Cup of Nations, securing second place with Tunisia in 1996, third with Ivory Coast (1994) and fourth with Mali (2002).  In September 2009, Kasperczak was briefly considered by PZPN for the open spot of manager of the Polish national team.

Club career
Kasperczak was born in Zabrze. With Stal Mielec, Kasperczak won two Ekstraklasa Championships in his native Poland. He had also played for the reserve team of Legia Warsaw, before ending his career in FC Metz.

International career
He played for Poland at the 1974 FIFA World Cup, securing third place; at the 1976 Summer Olympics, where the team won the silver medal, and at the 1978 FIFA World Cup.

Overall, Kaspeczak was capped 61 times and scored 5 goals.

Coaching career

Kasperczak spent the first fifteen years (1978–1993) of his coaching career in France, managing FC Metz, AS Saint-Étienne, Racing Strasbourg, Racing Club de Paris, Montpellier HSC and Lille OSC. His biggest success was winning Coupe de France with FC Metz in 1984.

Next, Kaspeczak managed two African national teams: first, Ivory Coast (1993–1994), achieving third place in the 1994 African Cup of Nations, and later Tunisia (1994–1998), which finished second in the 1996 Cup. Kasperczak also coached Tunisia at the 1996 Summer Olympics and the 1998 FIFA World Cup in France.

During the tournament, Kasperczak was fired and replaced by Ali Selmi, after Tunisia lost the chance to pass the group stage, losing to England (0–2) and Colombia (0–1).

Later, Kasperczak managed SC Bastia (1998), Al Wasl FC (1999–2000), Morocco national team (2000), Shenyang Haishi (2000–2001) and Mali national team (2001–2002). Mali won the fourth place at the 2002 African Cup of Nations under his coaching.

In 2002, Kasperczak came back to his native Poland, and spend the next three years as head coach of Wisła Kraków. Wisła won three Polish Championship under his coaching.

In 2006, Kaspeczak began managing Senegal (2006–2008), however he quit his post during the 2008 African Cup of Nations following a poor run of results which saw them with 1-point in 2 games in a group they had been expected to win.

On 16 September 2008, he took over as manager of Górnik Zabrze. He then left Górnik Zabrze on 3 April 2009 when the club was officially relegated from Ekstraklasa to I Liga, Poland's 2nd division in professional soccer.

On 15 March 2010, Wisła Kraków reached an agreement with the manager, Kasperczak replaces Maciej Skorża as a coach.

Honours

Player
Stal Mielec
Ekstraklasa: 1972–73, 1975–76
UEFA Intertoto Cup: 1971

Manager

FC Metz
Coupe de France: 1983–84

RC Strasbourg
Ligue 2: 1987–88

RC Paris
Coupe de France: runner-up 1989–90

Ivory Coast
African Cup of Nations: Third place 1994

Tunisia
African Cup of Nations: runner-up 1996

Mali
African Cup of Nations: fourth place 2002

Wisła Kraków
Ekstraklasa: 2002–03, 2003–04, 2004–05
Polish Cup: 2001–02, 2002–03

References

External links
 Henryk Kasperczak - from Mielec to conquer Africa

1946 births
Living people
Sportspeople from Zabrze
Polish footballers
Association football midfielders
Legia Warsaw players
Stal Mielec players
FC Metz players
Ekstraklasa players
Ligue 1 players
Olympic footballers of Poland
Poland international footballers
1974 FIFA World Cup players
Footballers at the 1976 Summer Olympics
1978 FIFA World Cup players
Olympic silver medalists for Poland
Medalists at the 1976 Summer Olympics
Olympic medalists in football
Polish expatriate footballers
Polish expatriate sportspeople in France
Expatriate footballers in France
Polish football managers
FC Metz managers
AS Saint-Étienne managers
RC Strasbourg Alsace managers
Racing Club de France Football managers
Montpellier HSC managers
Lille OSC managers
Ivory Coast national football team managers
Tunisia national football team managers
SC Bastia managers
Al-Wasl F.C. managers
Morocco national football team managers
Guangzhou City F.C. managers
Mali national football team managers
Wisła Kraków managers
Senegal national football team managers
Górnik Zabrze managers
Kavala F.C. managers
Ligue 1 managers
UAE Pro League managers
Chinese Super League managers
Super League Greece managers
1994 African Cup of Nations managers
1996 African Cup of Nations managers
1998 African Cup of Nations managers
1998 FIFA World Cup managers
2002 African Cup of Nations managers
2008 Africa Cup of Nations managers
2015 Africa Cup of Nations managers
2017 Africa Cup of Nations managers
Polish expatriate football managers
Polish expatriate sportspeople in Ivory Coast
Polish expatriate sportspeople in Tunisia
Polish expatriate sportspeople in the United Arab Emirates
Polish expatriate sportspeople in Morocco
Polish expatriate sportspeople in China
Polish expatriate sportspeople in Mali
Polish expatriate sportspeople in Greece
Expatriate football managers in France
Expatriate football managers in Ivory Coast
Expatriate football managers in Tunisia
Expatriate football managers in the United Arab Emirates
Expatriate football managers in Morocco
Expatriate football managers in China
Expatriate football managers in Mali
Expatriate football managers in Greece